A flagger is a traffic guard who directs traffic with flags.

Flagger may also refer to:

A member of Color guard (flag spinning)
A performer of the Italian art of flag throwing
A flagging dance
Flaggers (movement), in the Southern U.S., devoted to making the Confederate battle flag more visible

See also
Flagging (disambiguation)